Fashion Quarterly is a New Zealand-based fashion magazine, and the country's most widely read fashion title. It was founded in 1980, originally under the name Fashion and then Fashion New Zealand.

History 
Launched in 1980 by Paula Ryan and Don Hope., Fashion Quarterly began as a retail catalogue distributed for free in Christchurch letterboxes. Originally called Fashion, the magazine grew and was renamed Fashion New Zealand in 1982 before settling on Fashion Quarterly in 1986.

Many top New Zealand models, designers and photographers were featured in the magazine, including Rachel Hunter, Kylie Bax, Georgia Fowler, Emily Baker, Desmond Williams, Max Thompson, Craig Owen, Derek Henderson, Karen Walker and Trelise Cooper.

The magazine had several brand extensions, including FQ Men launched in 2004 and the millennial-focused Miss FQ launched in 2016.

The brand's website FQ.co.nz was launched in 2015, following an earlier online home at now defunct website Runway Reporter from 2006 to 2008.

In 1990, the magazine was purchased by Australian Consolidated Press), which was later sold to Bauer Media Group. In April 2020 Bauer closed its New Zealand business in response to the economic downturn caused by the COVID-19 pandemic in New Zealand, resulting in the closure of several titles including Fashion Quarterly.

Following Bauer Media’s closure, Fashion Quarterly was acquired by NZ-owned publisher Parkside Media  and resumed publishing in December 2020, with the relaunch cover featuring Georgia Fowler. Fashion Quarterly is now led by editor Nicole Saunders.

References

1980 establishments in New Zealand
Fashion magazines
Magazines established in 1980
Mass media in Auckland
Women's magazines published in New Zealand
Quarterly magazines
Women's fashion magazines